was a feudal domain under the Tokugawa shogunate of Edo period Japan, located in Kōzuke Province (modern-day Gunma Prefecture), Japan. It was centered on Takasaki Castle in what is now part of the city of Takasaki, Gunma. Takasaki was ruled through most of its history by a junior branch of the Matsudaira clan.

History
During the late Heian period, the area around what is now Takasaki was controlled by the Wada clan. During the Muromachi period, the Wada came under the service of the Uesugi clan, who held the post of Kantō kanrei; however in 1561, Wada Narishige, incensed over the appointment of Uesugi Kenshin to the post, defected to the Takeda. His son, Wada Nobunari, in turn came into the service of the Odawara Hōjō. During the Battle of Odawara in 1590, Toyotomi Hideyoshi dispatched an army led by Uesugi Kagekatsu and Maeda Toshiie and destroyed Wada Castle.

After Tokugawa Ieyasu took control over the Kantō region in 1590, he assigned Ii Naomasa, one of his most trusted Four Generals to nearby Minowa Castle, with revenues of 120,000 koku. However, in 1597, Ieyasu ordered Ii Naomasa to construct a new castle on the site of the ruins of Wada Castle, as the location controlled a strategic junction connecting the Nakasendō with the Mikuni Kaidō highways. Ii Naomasu relocated to the site in 1598, renaming it Takasaki, and bringing with him the population of Minowa to form the nucleus of a new castle town. This marked the beginning of Takasaki Domain.

Ii Naomasa was transferred to Hikone Domain, and Takasaki given to Sakai Ietsugu in 1604 with its revenues reduced to 50,000 koku. The domain then passed through two branches of the Matsudaira clan before it was awarded to Ando Shigenobu in 1619. The Andō clan ruled over three generations to 1695. Matsudaira Terusada of the Ōkōchi branch of the Matsudaira clan became daimyō in 1695. He also served in a number of important offices under Shōgun Tokugawa Tsunayoshi and Tokugawa Ienobu, and the domain was raised to 75,000 koku. He was replaced at Takasaki by Manabe Akifusa, another favorite of Tokugawa Ienobu in 1710, but returned to Takasaki in 1716, and his descendants continued to rule Takasaki until the end of the Edo period.

During the Bakumatsu period, forces of Takasaki Domain played a role in the suppression of the Tengutō Rebellion and the final daimyō, Matsudaira Teruna was ordered by the shogunate to defend Kōfu Castle during the Boshin War.

After the end of the conflict, with the abolition of the han system in July 1871, Takasaki Domain became “Takasaki Prefecture”, which later became part of Gunma Prefecture. 

The domain had a population of 3654 samurai in 916 households per a census in 1870.

Holdings at the end of the Edo period
As with most domains in the han system, Takasaki Domain consisted of several discontinuous territories calculated to provide the assigned kokudaka, based on periodic cadastral surveys and projected agricultural yields. 

Kōzuke Province
74 villages in Gunma District
9 villages in Usui District
2 villages in Midono District
3 villages in Kataoka District
1 village in Nawa District
Echigo Province
45 villages in Kanbara District
Musashi Province
5 villages in Niikura District
Shimōsa Province
18 villages in Kaijō District

List of daimyō

References

External links
 Takasaki on "Edo 300 HTML"

Notes

Domains of Japan
1590 establishments in Japan
States and territories established in 1590
1871 disestablishments in Japan
States and territories disestablished in 1871
Kōzuke Province
History of Gunma Prefecture
Fujii-Matsudaira clan
Ii clan
Ōkōchi-Matsudaira clan
Sakai clan
Toda-Matsudaira clan